The 1929 season was the eighteenth season for Santos FC.

References

External links
Official Site 

Santos
1929
1929 in Brazilian football